Duane Ollen Mutch (May 13, 1925 – July 17, 2019), was an American politician who was a member of the North Dakota State Senate. He served from 1959–1976 and 1979–2006. The son of Floyd (1895-1941) and Leona (1897-1986) Mutch, he was a bulk oil and propane distributor and infantry veteran of World War II (serving under George S. Patton). He died on July 17, 2019.

References

1925 births
2019 deaths
People from Grand Forks County, North Dakota
Military personnel from North Dakota
Businesspeople from North Dakota
Republican Party North Dakota state senators
20th-century American businesspeople